Yissachar Dov Rokeach could refer to:
Yissachar Dov Rokeach (third Belzer rebbe) (1854–1926), the third Rebbe of the Belz Hasidic dynasty
Yissachar Dov Rokeach (fifth Belzer rebbe) (born 1948), the fifth and current Rebbe of the Belz Hasidic dynasty